The 2015 Sioux Falls Storm season was the team's sixteenth season as a professional indoor football franchise and seventh in the Indoor Football League (IFL). One of ten teams that competed in the IFL for the 2015 season, the Sioux Falls Storm were members of the United Conference.

Led by head coach Kurtiss Riggs, the Storm played their home games at the Denny Sanford Premier Center in Sioux Falls, South Dakota.

Schedule
Key:

Pre-season

Regular season
All start times are local time

Standings

Postseason

Roster

References

External links
Sioux Falls Storm official statistics 

Sioux Falls Storm
Sioux Falls Storm
Sioux Falls Storm
United Bowl champion seasons